Helmut Hermann W. Hofer (born February 28, 1956) is a German-American mathematician, one of the founders of the area of symplectic topology.

He is a member of the National Academy of Sciences, and the recipient of the 1999 Ostrowski Prize
and the 2013 Heinz Hopf Prize. Since 2009, he is a faculty member at the Institute for Advanced Study in Princeton, New Jersey. He currently works on symplectic geometry, dynamical systems, and partial differential equations. His contributions to the field include Hofer geometry. Hofer was elected to the American Academy of Arts and Sciences in 2020.

He was an invited speaker at the International Congress of Mathematicians (ICM) in 1990 in Kyoto and a plenary speaker at the ICM in 1998 in Berlin.

Selected publications

Notes

External links

Oberwolfach photos of Helmut Hofer

Geometers
20th-century German mathematicians
21st-century German mathematicians
Institute for Advanced Study faculty
Members of the United States National Academy of Sciences
Living people
1956 births
Courant Institute of Mathematical Sciences faculty
Academic staff of ETH Zurich
Fellows of the American Mathematical Society